The Arboretum de la Grand Prée (4 hectares) is an arboretum located at 2 impasse Petit Pavillon, Le Mans, Sarthe, Pays de la Loire, France. It is open by appointment.

See also 
 List of botanical gardens in France

References 
 L'Echo des Chênaies: Arboretum de la Grand Prée

Gardens in Sarthe
Grand Prée